Robert Owen Bowen (born May 7, 1920, in Bridgeport, Connecticut; died June 9, 2003, in Anchorage, Alaska) was an  American novelist and essayist.

Biography
Bowen served in the United States Navy in during World War II and was a prisoner of war in the Philippines. He was discharged as a Weapons Technician (Third Class Petty Officer). After World War II, he earned bachelor's and master's degrees, a Phi Beta Kappa key and a Fulbright scholarship to Wales, where he studied Welsh prosody. Mr. Bowen was an author, professor, editor, writer in residence at Cornell, the University of Washington, and the Iowa Writer's Workshop. In 1963 Mr. Bowen moved to Anchorage and was a professor.  He was commander of the Alaska chapter of the American Ex-POWs.  In 2002, he received the Alaskan of the Year Governor's Award for a three-year effort in organizing the Veterans Statue project on the Delaney Park Strip.

Works

Novels
 The Weight of the Cross (1951, novel)
 Bamboo (1953, novel)
 Sidestreets (1953, novel)
 Strangers (1956, novel)
 Trapper's Peak (1958, novel)

Essays
 Practical Prose Studies (1956, collection of essays)
 The New Professor (1956, collection of essays)
 The Truth about Communism (1962, collection of essays)
 The College Style Manual (1963, collection of essays)
 Alaskan Dictionary (1966, collection of travel articles)

Other works
 The Beacon Annual (1958, collection of short fiction)
 Mountain Child (1959, play)

Later life
Bowen is buried at Fort Richardson National Cemetery in Fort Richardson, Anchorage Borough, Alaska.

References

External links

The Quan PITTSBURGH, PA — SEPTEMBER, 2006 Death notice on page 16

1920 births
2003 deaths
Writers from Bridgeport, Connecticut
Writers from Anchorage, Alaska
Military personnel from Bridgeport, Connecticut
United States Navy sailors
United States Navy personnel of World War II
American prisoners of war in World War II
20th-century American novelists
20th-century American male writers
American male novelists
American male essayists
20th-century American essayists
Novelists from Connecticut